Clare Bryant is a British veterinary scientist and clinical pharmacologist who is a professor at the University of Cambridge. She specialises in innate immunity. Bryant is a Fellow of Queens' College, Cambridge and of the British Pharmacological Society.

Early life and education 
Bryant was an undergraduate in biochemistry and physiology at the University of Southampton. She trained in veterinary medicine in London. She was supported by the Wellcome Trust to complete a doctorate. Her research first concentrated on anaesthesia, but soon shifted focus to concentrate on receptor pharmacology. She spent four years as a Wellcome Trust postdoctoral fellow with John Vane at the William Harvey Research Institute. She started her independent career at the University of Cambridge.

Research and career 
Bryant studies how hosts recognise bacteria using pattern recognition receptors (PRR). She is interested in how these PRR are related to chronic inflammatory diseases, for example Alzheimer's disease. There are several different types of PRR, including Toll-like receptors and NOD-like receptors. She is particularly interested in the PRRs that detect Salmonella enterica. Bryant has studied how ligands on the outer-membranes of bacteria (for example, lipopolysaccharides like endotoxin) interact with PRR to recruit signalling molecules.

Bryant's research demonstrated the power of Fluorescence Resonance Energy Transfer (FRET) and single-molecule fluorescence microscopy to understand the function of toll-like receptors and super resolution microscopy to determine the function of NOD-like receptors to work out how these PRRs form signalling. When allergens are contaminated by endotoxins they can be detected by toll-like receptors. By preventing this detection, Bryant believes it may be possible to design inhibitors that suppress the onset of allergenic responses. As the proteins produced in neuroinflammatory diseases such as Alzheimer's and Parkinson's are recognised by toll-like receptors and induce inflammation, these studies may identify novel treatments for neurodegenerative conditions.

Selected publications

References 

Year of birth missing (living people)
Living people
Place of birth missing (living people)
Veterinary scientists
Women veterinary scientists
British veterinarians
Clinical pharmacologists
Women pharmacologists
British pharmacologists
Academics of the University of Cambridge
Fellows of Queens' College, Cambridge
Fellows of the British Pharmacological Society
Alumni of the Royal Veterinary College
Alumni of the University of London